Roseland is a borough in western Essex County, New Jersey. As of the 2020 United States census, the borough's population was 6,299, an increase of 480 (+8.2%) from the 2010 census count of 5,819, which in turn reflected an increase of 521 (+9.8%) from the 5,298 counted in the 2000 census.

In 2015, New Jersey Monthly magazine ranked Roseland as its seventh-best place to live in its "Best Places To Live" in New Jersey rankings. The borough was ranked 14th best place to live in the magazine's 2008 rankings. In 2017, New Jersey Monthly Ranked Roseland as its 106th best place to live in its 2017 Rankings. New Jersey Monthly magazine ranked Roseland as its 14th best place to live in New Jersey in its 2019 rankings.

History
Roseland was part of the Horseneck Tract, which was an area that consisted of what are now the municipalities of Caldwell, West Caldwell, North Caldwell, Fairfield, Verona, Cedar Grove, Essex Fells, Roseland, and portions of Livingston and West Orange. In 1702, settlers purchased the  Horseneck Tract—so-called because of its irregular shape that suggested a horse's neck and head—from the Lenni Lenape Native Americans for goods equal to $325. This purchase encompassed much of western Essex County, from the First Mountain to the Passaic River.

Originally named Centerville, the name of the community was changed in 1874 to Roseland to avoid confusion with the several other Centervilles spread across the state, most specifically Centerville, Hunterdon County, New Jersey, which already had a post office under that name. Roseland was chosen over the alternative proposed name of "Roselyn".

One of the most notable places of interest in the borough was the Becker Farm Railroad, otherwise known as the Centerville & Southwestern Railroad. A miniature railroad operated from 1938 until 1972 on the Becker Farm, which once comprised nearly half of the total area within Roseland and which is now mostly a large business complex. Some vestiges of the railroad still exist.

In 1907, a delegation of residents petitioned Livingston Township officials to construct a school for the growing population in Roseland. The rejection of their request led to the efforts to create an independent municipality, which was established on April 10, 1908.

Roseland was incorporated as a borough by an act of the New Jersey Legislature on April 10, 1908, from portions of Livingston Township.

Geography
According to the United States Census Bureau, the borough had a total area of 3.64 square miles (9.43 km2), including 3.62 square miles (9.37 km2) of land and 0.03 square miles (0.06 km2) of water (0.69%).

The borough borders the municipalities of Essex Fells, Livingston, West Caldwell and West Orange in Essex County; and East Hanover Township in Morris County.

Demographics

2010 census

The Census Bureau's 2006–2010 American Community Survey showed that (in 2010 inflation-adjusted dollars) median household income was $100,289 (with a margin of error of +/− $10,283) and the median family income was $116,118 (+/− $20,786). Males had a median income of $83,864 (+/− $16,862) versus $58,611 (+/− $12,592) for females. The per capita income for the borough was $53,042 (+/− $7,511). About 1.9% of families and 1.9% of the population were below the poverty line, including 0.8% of those under age 18 and 3.9% of those age 65 or over.

2000 census
As of the 2000 United States census there were 5,298 people, 2,142 households, and 1,525 families residing in the borough. The population density was 1,463.6 people per square mile (565.1/km2). There were 2,187 housing units at an average density of 604.2 per square mile (233.3/km2). The racial makeup of the borough was 93.43% White, 0.72% African American, 0.04% Native American, 4.72% Asian, 0.43% from other races, and 0.66% from two or more races. Hispanic or Latino of any race were 2.28% of the population.

As of the 2000 Census, 32.0% of Roseland residents were of Italian ancestry, the 27th-highest percentage of any municipality in the United States, and 10th-highest in New Jersey, among all places with more than 1,000 residents identifying their ancestry.

There were 2,142 households, out of which 26.2% had children under the age of 18 living with them, 60.8% were married couples living together, 7.9% had a female householder with no husband present, and 28.8% were non-families. 25.7% of all households were made up of individuals, and 13.4% had someone living alone who was 65 years of age or older. The average household size was 2.47 and the average family size was 2.99.

In the borough the population was spread out, with 20.6% under the age of 18, 4.2% from 18 to 24, 26.3% from 25 to 44, 29.2% from 45 to 64, and 19.7% who were 65 years of age or older. The median age was 44 years. For every 100 females, there were 85.9 males. For every 100 females age 18 and over, there were 82.6 males.

The median income for a household in the borough was $82,499, and the median income for a family was $93,957. Males had a median income of $61,049 versus $41,688 for females. The per capita income for the borough was $41,415. None of the families and 1.7% of the population were living below the poverty line, including no under eighteens and 2.7% of those over 64.

Economy
Companies based in Roseland include Automatic Data Processing, law firms Lowenstein Sandler Connell Foley, Curtiss-Wright,   jams and jellys manufacturer Polaner, pickles and relish products maker B&G Foods, and pharmaceutical company Organon International, which opened its worldwide headquarters here in 2003.

Arts and culture
Cash Cash members Jean Paul Makhlouf, Alexander Makhlouf and Samuel Frisch signed to Atlantic Records with the top 40 hit song "Take Me Home".

Government

Local government
Roseland is governed under the Borough form of New Jersey municipal government, which is used in 218 municipalities (of the 564) statewide, making it the most common form of government in New Jersey. The governing body is comprised of the Mayor and the Borough Council, with all positions elected at-large on a partisan basis as part of the November general election. The Mayor is elected directly by the voters to a four-year term of office. The Borough Council is comprised of six members elected to serve three-year terms on a staggered basis, with two seats coming up for election each year in a three-year cycle. The Borough form of government used by Roseland is a "weak mayor / strong council" government in which council members act as the legislative body with the mayor presiding at meetings and voting only in the event of a tie. The mayor can veto ordinances subject to an override by a two-thirds majority vote of the council. The mayor makes committee and liaison assignments for council members, and most appointments are made by the mayor with the advice and consent of the council.

, the Mayor of Roseland is Democrat James R. Spango, whose term of office ends December 31, 2026. Members of the Roseland Borough Council are Jean Perrotti (R, 2025), Christopher Bardi (D, 2023), Eileen Fishman (D, 2024), Roger Freda (D, 2024), Michele Tolli (R, 2023) and Marcelino "Moose" Trillo (D, 2025).

Roseland TV - Public Access Television Station
The Borough of Roseland has a local access television channel, Roseland TV. On Comcast, residents can watch Roseland TV on Channel 35. On Verizon FiOS, residents can watch on Channel 46, though the channel will switch to 2146 in HD by the end of 2021.

Federal, state and county representation
Roseland is located in the 11th Congressional District and is part of New Jersey's 27th state legislative district.

Politics
As of March 2011, there were a total of 4,686 registered voters in Roseland, of which 1,428 (30.5%) were registered as Democrats, 1,499 (32.0%) were registered as Republicans and 1,756 (37.5%) were registered as Unaffiliated. There were no voters registered to other parties.

In the 2012 presidential election, Republican Mitt Romney received 58.4% of the vote (1,983 cast), ahead of Democrat Barack Obama with 40.9% (1,391 votes), and other candidates with 0.7% (23 votes), among the 3,425 ballots cast by the borough's 4,832 registered voters (28 ballots were spoiled), for a turnout of 70.9%. In the 2008 presidential election, Republican John McCain received 57.5% of the vote (2,065 cast), ahead of Democrat Barack Obama with 40.8% (1,466 votes) and other candidates with 0.8% (29 votes), among the 3,593 ballots cast by the borough's 4,728 registered voters, for a turnout of 76.0%. In the 2004 presidential election, Republican George W. Bush received 59.4% of the vote (2,062 ballots cast), outpolling Democrat John Kerry with 39.6% (1,376 votes) and other candidates with 0.5% (24 votes), among the 3,471 ballots cast by the borough's 4,425 registered voters, for a turnout percentage of 78.4.

In the 2013 gubernatorial election, Republican Chris Christie received 69.9% of the vote (1,559 cast), ahead of Democrat Barbara Buono with 29.2% (652 votes), and other candidates with 0.9% (19 votes), among the 2,275 ballots cast by the borough's 4,858 registered voters (45 ballots were spoiled), for a turnout of 46.8%. In the 2009 gubernatorial election, Republican Chris Christie received 58.7% of the vote (1,579 ballots cast), ahead of  Democrat Jon Corzine with 33.1% (891 votes), Independent Chris Daggett with 7.2% (193 votes) and other candidates with 0.4% (11 votes), among the 2,691 ballots cast by the borough's 4,658 registered voters, yielding a 57.8% turnout.

Education
The Roseland School District serves public school students in pre-kindergarten through sixth grade at Lester C. Noecker Elementary School. As of the 2018–19 school year, the district, comprised of one school, had an enrollment of 472 students and 40.1 classroom teachers (on an FTE basis), for a student–teacher ratio of 11.8:1.

Students in public school for seventh through twelfth grades attend the West Essex Regional School District, a regional school district serving students from four municipalities in western Essex County. Communities served by the district's schools are Essex Fells, Fairfield, North Caldwell and Roseland. Schools in the district (with 2018–19 enrollment data from the National Center for Education Statistics) are 
West Essex Middle School with 564 students in grades 7–8 and 
West Essex High School with 1,123 students in grades 9–12. Seats on the nine-member board of education of the high school district are allocated based on population, with two seats assigned to Roseland.

Transportation

Roads and highways

Interstate 280 passes for  through the borough, connecting East Hanover Township and Livingston. County Route 527 also passes through the borough.

Public transportation
NJ Transit offers bus service to Newark on the 71 route.

The Whippany Line of the Morristown & Erie Railway, a small freight line, traverses and serves a food products manufacturer in the township. Established in 1895, the line runs from Morristown and runs through East Hanover Township and Hanover Township to Roseland.

Notable people

People who were born in, residents of, or otherwise closely associated with Roseland include:

 Denise Borino-Quinn (1964–2010), actress who played the role of Ginny Sacramoni, the wife of New York mob boss Johnny Sack in The Sopranos
 Mary Jo Codey (born 1955), mental health advocate and schoolteacher who is the former First Lady of New Jersey
 Richard Codey (born 1946), member of the New Jersey Senate
 Joseph N. DiVincenzo Jr. (born 1952), County Executive of Essex County since 2003
 Kevin Monangai (born 1993), running back for the Philadelphia Eagles of the National Football League
 Janet G. Woititz (–1994), psychologist and researcher best known for her writings and lectures about the adult children of alcoholic parents
 Adella Wotherspoon (1903–2004), survivor of the 1904 General Slocum disaster, in which more than 1,000 passengers were killed in a fire

References

External links

 
1908 establishments in New Jersey
Borough form of New Jersey government
Boroughs in Essex County, New Jersey
Populated places established in 1908